Walking Papers is an American rock band from Seattle, Washington, formed in 2012. The band was formed by singer/guitarist Jeff Angell of The Missionary Position, and drummer Barrett Martin formerly of Screaming Trees. Guns N' Roses bassist Duff McKagan and keyboardist Benjamin Anderson (also of The Missionary Position) were invited to contribute to the band's first album and then were added as official members. Their self-titled debut album, produced by Angell and Martin and mixed by Jack Endino, was released on August 16, 2013 and featured contributions by Pearl Jam guitarist Mike McCready.

The band was then inactive for several years, and returned with the album WP2 on January 19, 2018. McKagan was unable to tour behind the album due to commitments with Guns N' Roses, and was replaced by Dan Spalding. Martin was also unable to tour and was replaced by Will Andrews from Ten Miles Wide. The band also added second guitarist Tristan Hart Pierce and saxophonist Gregor Lothian. 

"What Did You Expect", a single from the band's third album The Light Below, was released on August 5, 2020, exclusively on Loudwire. The album was released on February 5 2021, on Carry On Music.

Members

Current members
Jeff Angell – lead vocals, guitar, piano
Benjamin Anderson – keyboards, backing vocals
Will Andrews – drums, percussion
Gregor Lothian – saxophone

Original members
Jeff Angell – lead vocals, guitar, piano
Barrett Martin – drums
Duff McKagan – bass
Benjamin Anderson – keyboards, backing vocals

Discography
Studio albums
 Walking Papers (2013)
 WP2 (2018)
 The Light Below (2021)

References

External links 
 
 Walking Papers on Spotify

Rock music supergroups
Musical groups from Seattle
Musical groups established in 2012
2012 establishments in Washington (state)